Tiddis (also known as Castellum Tidditanorum or Tiddi) was a Roman city that depended on Cirta and a bishopric as "Tiddi", which remains a Latin Catholic titular see.
 
It was located on the territory of the current commune of Bni Hamden in the Constantine Province of eastern Algeria.

History 
Tiddis was built by the Romans as a "vicus" & defensive castellum of the Confederatio Cirtense, initially administered by Cirta's Roman colonists and successively arranged according to their system of urbanization.

This prosperous town, established on a plateau, had a monumental gate, baths, industrial facilities (tanneries), a sanctuary to Mithras dating back to the 4th century BC, and also a Christian chapel.

Castles and water tanks of all forms remind us that the city has gradually been abandoned because it lacked sources. One can admire the mausoleum that Quintus Lollius Urbicus built, a native of Tiddis (and son of a romanised Berber landowner) who then became prefect of Rome.

The local romance speaking community probably disappeared with the Arab conquest in the second half of the 7th century, but some pottery remains showed the survival of a small village -with some christian inhabitants- inside the ruins of Tiddis until the XI century.

Today, Tiddis is an authentic Roman site called Res eddar or the "peak of the House" located in the Gorge of the Khreneg, just north of Cirta. It marks the presence of a Roman civilization through rock art inscriptions and Roman pottery.

Ecclesiastical history 
Under Byzantine control, Castellum Tidditanorum had two small churches and was the see of a diocese.
 
Four bishops are assigned by Morcelli to this see, but Mesnage and Jaubert believe they were bishops of Tisedi, leaving only
 Abundius, attending the Council of Carthage called in 484 by king Huneric of the Vandal Kingdom, afterwards exiled like most Catholics, unlike their Donatist schismatic heretic-counterparts.

Titular see 
In 1925 was established the "Titular Episcopal See of Tiddis"

Titular Bishop. Titular Archbishop (1985.09.14 – ...):	Archbishop Eugenio Sbarbaro 

Former Titular Bishops. Titular Bishop:  Bishop Cesar Benedetti, O.F.M. (1951.02.08 – 1983.04.04); Titular Bishop:  Bishop Joseph Brendan Whelan, C.S.Sp. (1948.02.12 – 1950.04.18); Titular Bishop:  Archbishop Mečislovas Reinys (1926.04.05 – 1940.07.18)

Famous locals 
 Quintus Lollius Urbicus
 Lollia (gens)

See also 

 List of Catholic dioceses in Algeria
 Confederatio Cirtense
 Cirta

References

Sources and external links 

 GCatholic - Tiddi

Bibliography 
 André Berthier Tiddis. Antique Castellum Tidditanorum Academie des Belles lettres. Paris, 1951
 Bonifacius Gams, Series episcoporum Ecclesiae Catholicae, Leipzig 1931, p. 469
 Stefano Antonio Morcelli, Africa christiana, Volume I, Brescia 1816, pp. 320–321
 J. Mesnage, L'Afrique chrétienne, Paris 1912, p. 315
 H. Jaubert, Anciens évêchés et ruines chrétiennes de la Numidie et de la Sitifienne, in Recueil des Notices et Mémoires de la Société archéologique de Constantine, vol. 46, 1913, p. 93

Roman towns and cities in Mauretania Caesariensis
Roman towns and cities in Algeria
Constantine, Algeria
Archaeological sites in Algeria
Populated places established in the 1st millennium
Former populated places in Algeria
Buildings and structures in Constantine Province
Catholic titular sees in Africa